All Creatures Will Make Merry is the second studio album by Scottish indie folk band Meursault, released on 24 May 2010. A limited edition, hand-printed version of the album was released in April 2010. Songwriter, vocalist and guitarist Neil Pennycook states that "the main theme of the record is one of contentment – what people are willing to do to obtain it, hold on to it, and what we stand to lose or gain if we try."

Background and recording
Following the critical acclaim of the band's debut album, Pissing On Bonfires / Kissing With Tongues, a newly extended version of Meursault recorded All Creatures Will Make Merry in the winter of 2009, in Stockbridge, Edinburgh. Songwriter, vocalist and guitarist Neil Pennycook states that "playing with a full live band helped shape this record considerably," and praised the contributions of both Phillip Quirie and Pete Harvey: "[they] opened up a huge range of possibilities with these songs."

Pennycook states that his production was influenced by The Microphones and Mount Eerie.

The names of the album and its titular third track come from the 1980 film adaptation of Flash Gordon; as the tyrannical Ming the Merciless prepares to forcefully wed Earthling woman Dale, a ship flies over his ceremony bearing the banner, "All creatures will make merry," and shortly afterward is followed by another that reads, "Under pain of death." Pennycook chose the phrase because he felt it fit with the album's themes of "the pursuit of happiness and how it's the one thing that ultimately everyone has in common."

Content
According to songwriter Neil Pennycook, "the themes and motivation behind All Creatures Will Make Merry come from completely different place than those on Pissing on Bonfires/Kissing With Tongues. I feel a certain duty to myself in terms of my own expectations for this album, other than that I couldn't imagine making an album to someone else's supposed criteria, that is my idea of hell."

Track listing
All songs written by Neil Pennycook, performed by Meursault.

Personnel

Meursault
Chris Bryant
Fraser Calder
Peter Harvey
Calum MacLeod
Neil Pennycook
Philip Quirie
Gavin Tarling

Production and design
Neil Pennycook - recording
Brothers Grimm - artwork

References

External links
 Meursault on MySpace
 Song, by Toad Records

2010 albums
Meursault (band) albums